Reseda Boulevard, named Reseda Avenue until May 1929, is a major north–south arterial road that runs through the western San Fernando Valley region of Los Angeles, California.  

It passes through the  community of Tarzana, passes Mulholland Park gated community and El Caballero Country Club, then continues into the flats of the Valley through the communities of Reseda and Northridge, passes the campus of California State University Northridge, and ends at Porter Ranch. The epicenter of the 1994 Northridge earthquake was approximately one block west of the Boulevard, in its namesake community of Reseda. Damage occurred throughout the San Fernando Valley though areas of more widespread destruction followed along the boulevard's northern course, including an apartment building which stood at the time, the Northridge Meadows Apartments, where 16 people died when the top two floors collapsed on the ground-floor apartments.

Communities along Reseda Boulevard

(Order is from south to north)
Tarzana – south of Victory Boulevard
Reseda – between Victory Boulevard and Roscoe Boulevard
Northridge – between Roscoe Boulevard and the Ronald Reagan Freeway (SR 118)
Porter Ranch – north of SR 118

Transportation
Metro Local line 240 runs along Reseda Boulevard. Reseda also crosses the G Line at its station located at its intersection with Oxnard Street.

Reseda Boulevard is a targeted Vision Zero corridor and is included in Mayor Eric Garcetti's Great Streets Initiative which calls for protected bicycle lanes, bus boarding islands, hybrid protected left turn signals and improved bus shelters.

In 1977 the Los Angeles City Council failed to approve a plan to create a "Reseda to the Sea" link from the San Fernando Valley to L.A.'s Westside at Sunset Boulevard. Although no alternative plans were evaluated, the city continued to maintain an easement of the proposed alignment until at least 1991. This, along with an ongoing requirement that developers continue to dedicate and extend Reseda as far south as Mulholland Drive to improve fire safety, sparked criticism and protests by environmental and community activists. As of 2019, Reseda Boulevard has not been extended to Mulholland Drive.

Landmarks along Reseda Boulevard
(The landmarks are ordered south to north)
Marvin Braude Mulholland Gateway Park – a  preserve of wild land located in the Santa Monica Mountains at the southern terminus of Reseda Boulevard in Tarzana.  The park is named for Los Angeles City Councilman Marvin Braude, who for more than 30 years led the effort to preserve the Santa Monica Mountains.  Up the hill a short distance is "dirt Mulholland", the unfinished dirt part of Mulholland Drive from west of the 405 freeway to Canoga Avenue in Woodland Hills, left unfinished to prevent development and encourage hiking and biking.

Mulholland Park Gated Community – located at the southern end of Reseda Boulevard, just below Marvin Braude Mulholland Gate, Mulholland Park is a gated communities and is the home to many celebrities.
Braemar Country Club – country club located in the Santa Monica Mountains overlooking the San Fernando Valley; facilities include two 18-hole golf courses, 20 tennis courts, swimming, yoga, and dining.
El Caballero Country Club – country club located in the hills of Tarzana; facilities include an 18-hole golf course that hosted the City of Hope Office Depot LPGA Championship from 2001–2003, and has been the choice for the U.S.G.A. sectional qualifying rounds for many years.
Tarzan Ranch – In 1919, Edgar Rice Burroughs moved to California, where he purchased the  estate of General Harrison Gray Otis (founder of the Los Angeles Times), renaming it "Tarzan Ranch". Reseda Boulevard in Tarzana runs through the former Tarzan Ranch.  In 1923, Burroughs sold a large portion of his ranch for home sites. In 1930, the new community was named Tarzana.

Reseda Park and Reseda Recreation Center – park and recreation center located at 18411 Victory Boiulevard, including barbecue pits, baseball diamond, basketball courts, children's play area, community room, picnic tables, seasonal pool, tennis courts and volleyball courts.
Northridge Meadows Apartments (9565 Reseda Boulevard) – former site of a three-story, 120-unit apartment complex that collapsed in the 1994 Northridge earthquake; sixteen fatalities resulted from the collapse of the building.

Northridge Hospital Medical Center – a 411-bed hospital founded in 1955 and located one block east of Reseda Boulevard on Roscoe, is one of two certified Level II trauma centers in the San Fernando Valley. Though  located very near the epicenter of the 1994 Northridge earthquake and was damaged, it remained open and over 1,000 patients were treated in 48 hours following the earthquake.
California State University, Northridge – located to the east of Reseda Boulevard between Nordhoff Street and Halsted Street, Cal State Northridge was founded in 1954 and is a four-year university in the Cal State system with 34,000 students, over 4,000 faculty and staff, sited on a  campus in the San Fernando Valley.
Faith Bible Church – Originally known as the Norwegian Lutheran Church, Faith Bible Church, located at 18531 Gresham Street, Northridge, was built in 1917 in the Gothic style. It was declared a historic site in 1976.

Northridge Park and Recreation Center – a Los Angeles city park and recreation complex including a licensed child care facility, preschool building, historic Cultural Arts House and a community building.
Oakridge and Grounds – located just west of Reseda Boulevard at 18650 Devonshire St, Northridge.  Built in 1937 and designed by architect Paul R. Williams in the English Manor style for actress, Barbara Stanwyck, Jack Oakie and his wife purchased the home from Stanwyck a short time later. The house has had very few alterations and was designated a historical site in 1990.  An entertaining video tour of the Oakridge Estate is available on the Wandrlust web site.
Devonshire Downs – a former horse racing track and fairgrounds located on Devonshire between Reseda Boulevard and Zelzah.  It is best known for hosting the three-day Newport '69 Pop Festival in July 1969 featuring Jethro Tull, Jimi Hendrix, The Animals, Marvin Gaye, Joe Cocker, Ike and Tina Turner, the Byrds, and The Chambers Brothers. It is currently the north campus of Cal State Northridge.

See also
 Reseda, Los Angeles#Featured sites

References

External links

Streets in the San Fernando Valley
Streets in Los Angeles
Boulevards in the United States
B
Northridge, Los Angeles
Porter Ranch, Los Angeles
Tarzana, Los Angeles